Azzolina is an Italian language surname.

List of people with the surname 
 Gaetano Azzolina (1931–2023), Italian doctor and politician
 Jay Azzolina (born 1952), American jazz musician
 Joseph Azzolina (1926–2010), American politician
 Lucia Azzolina (born 1982), Italian politician

Surnames of Italian origin
Italian-language surnames